Pierre Riché (October 4, 1921 – May 6, 2019) was a French historian specializing in the early Middle Ages and the year 1000 (French: An mil or An mille).

Biography 
After studying at the Faculté des lettres de Paris, he passed the aggregation of history in 1948, and taught at the high school of Constantine (Algeria) and at Le Mans. In 1953, he was appointed assistant at the Sorbonne.

From 1957 to 1960 Pierre Riché taught as assistant professor in Tunis, before joining the University of Rennes. In 1962, he obtained his doctorate of 3 with a thesis on Education and culture in the barbaric West. He was then appointed professor at the Faculty of letters of Nanterre in October 1967. In 1968, he founded the Center for Research on Late Antiquity and the Early Middle Ages. He retired in 1989.

He is the father of the journalist Pascal Riché.

Works 
 La vie des enfants au Moyen Âge, Sorbier, coll. «La vie des enfants…», 2005 (with Danièle Alexandre-Bidon)
 Henri-Irénée Marrou, historien engagé, Cerf, 2003
 Les Invasions barbares, PUF, coll. «Que sais-je ?», 1953; 2003 (with Philippe Le Maître)
 L'Europe de l'an mil, Éditions Zodiaque, 2001
 Écoles et enseignement dans le haut Moyen Âge, Picard, 2000
 Les grandeurs de l'An Mille, éditions Bartillat, 1999
 Dictionnaire des Francs. Les temps mérovingiens, Christian de Bartillat, 1999 (with Patrick Périn)
 Les Carolingiens, Hachette, coll. «Pluriel», 1997
 Éducation et culture dans l'Occident barbare : s-VIe -VIIIe, Seuil, coll. «Points Histoire», 1995 (4th edition)
 Césaire d'Arles, De l'Atelier, 1989
 L'Europe barbare de 476 à 774, SEDES, Paris, 1989
 Gerbert d'Aurillac : Le Pape de l'an mil, Fayard, 1987
 Abbon de Fleury, un moine savant et combatif, Brepols, 2004
 Grandeur et faiblesse de l'Église au Moyen Âge, Cerf, 2006
 Des nains sur des épaules de géants : maître et élèves au Moyen Âge, Tallandier, 2006
 C'était un autre millénaire, souvenir d'un professeur de la communale à Nanterre, Tallandier, 2008

References 

1921 births
2019 deaths
Academic staff of Paris Nanterre University
Economic historians
French medievalists
Historians of France
Chevaliers of the Légion d'honneur
French male writers
20th-century French historians